Scott Vorst is a retired American soccer defender who played professionally in the North American Soccer League and the Major Indoor Soccer League.

In 1977, Vorst played for the Saint Louis Billikens men's soccer.  In 1978, he turned professional with the Los Angeles Aztecs of the North American Soccer League.  In the fall of 1978, he moved to the St. Louis Steamers of the Major Indoor Soccer League.

References

External links
NASL/MISL stats

Soccer players from St. Louis
American soccer players
Living people
Los Angeles Aztecs players
Major Indoor Soccer League (1978–1992) players
North American Soccer League (1968–1984) players
Saint Louis Billikens men's soccer players
St. Louis Steamers (original MISL) players
Association football defenders
Year of birth missing (living people)